The Very Best of Soft Cell is a greatest hits album by English synth-pop duo Soft Cell. It was released on 16 April 2002 by Mercury Records, Universal Music TV and Some Bizzare Records. The album includes most of the duo's singles, as well as B-sides, such as "Insecure Me" (in a newly edited version) and "It's a Mug's Game". The song "Numbers" was considerably shortened for this release, while its AA side "Barriers" was omitted. Two new songs, "Somebody, Somewhere, Sometime" and "Divided Soul", and two brand-new remixes of "Tainted Love" and "Say Hello, Wave Goodbye" were also included. The album reached number 37 on the UK Albums Chart.

Track listing

Personnel
Credits adapted from the liner notes of The Very Best of Soft Cell.

Soft Cell
 Marc Almond – vocals, percussion
 David James Ball – synthesisers, guitars

Technical

 Daniel Miller – production 
 Mike Thorne – production 
 Soft Cell – production 
 David James Ball – production ; remix 
 Ingo Vauk – production 
 Paul Hardiman – engineering 
 Flood – remix assistance 
 Damien Mendis – remix production, remix performance 
 Stuart Bradbury – remix production, remix performance 
 Almighty Associates – remix

Artwork
 Peter Ashworth – all band photography
 Peacock – design
 Stephen Dalton – sleeve notes

Charts

Certifications

References

2002 greatest hits albums
Albums produced by Daniel Miller (music producer)
Albums produced by Mike Thorne
Mercury Records compilation albums
Soft Cell albums
Some Bizzare Records compilation albums
Universal Music TV albums